Bogušiškiai is a village in Kėdainiai district municipality, in Kaunas County, central Lithuania. It is located nearby Vištupis rivulet and Jonava-Šeduva road. According to the 2011 census, the village has a population of 17 people.

Demography

References

Villages in Kaunas County
Kėdainiai District Municipality